Elections to Liverpool City Council were held on 7 May 1964.

After the election, the composition of the council was:

Note that there was one Conservative Aldermanic vacancy.

Election result

Ward results

* - Councillor seeking re-election

(PARTY) - Party of former Councillor

The Councillors seeking re-election at this election were elected in 1961 for a three-year term, therefore comparisons are made with the 1961 election results.

Abercromby

Aigburth

Allerton

Anfield

Arundel

Breckfield

Broadgreen

Central

Childwall

Church

Clubmoor

County

Croxteth

Dingle

Dovecot

Everton

Fairfield

Fazakerley

Gillmoss

Granby

Kensington

Low Hill

Melrose

Netherfield

Old Swan

Picton

Pirrie

Prince's Park

Sandhills

St. Domingo

St. James

St. Mary's

St. Michael's

Smithdown

Speke

Tuebrook

Vauxhall

Warbreck

Westminster

Woolton

Aldermanic Elections

Twenty of the forty Aldermen were elected by the city council on 20 May 1964. There were 20 vacancies, 7 Conservative and 13 Labour, with 20 Labour candidates returned.
Those elected by the council and the wards they were allocated to are shown in the table below:

Re-elected

References

1964
Liverpool City Council election
City Council election, 1964
Liverpool City Council election